Duncan James Watts (born February 20, 1971) is a sociologist and a professor at the University of Pennsylvania. He was formerly a principal researcher at Microsoft Research in New York City, and is known for his work on small-world networks.

Education
Watts received a Bachelor of Science degree in physics from the University of New South Wales and a PhD in Theoretical and Applied Mechanics from Cornell University, where his advisor was Steven Strogatz.

Career
Watts joined the faculty of the University of Pennsylvania in July 2019 as a PIK Professor.  He has joint appointments in Engineering, Communications and Business.

Watts was past external faculty member of the Santa Fe Institute and a former professor of sociology at Columbia University, where he headed the Collective Dynamics Group. He is also author of two books. His first, Six Degrees: The Science of a Connected Age is based on the six degrees research in his 1998 paper with Steven Strogatz, in which the two presented a mathematical theory of the small world phenomenon. His second book, Everything is Obvious *Once You Know the Answer: How Common Sense Fails Us, explains common errors people make when making decisions especially for groups or organizations, and suggests alternative methods using research and data. He also presents some of his research from Yahoo and Microsoft, and comments on the work of some popular nonfiction writers like Malcolm Gladwell.

Until April 2012, he was a principal research scientist at Yahoo! Research, where he directed the Human Social Dynamics group. Watts joined Microsoft Research in New York City by its opening on May 3, 2012.

Watts describes his research as exploring the "role that network structure plays in determining or constraining system behavior, focusing on a few broad problem areas in social science such as information contagion, financial risk management, and organizational design."   More recently he has attracted attention for his modern-day replication of Stanley Milgram's small world experiment using email messages and for his studies of popularity and fads in on-line and other communities.

In Watts's early career, from 2002 to 2007, he was a frequent collaborator of Peter Sheridan Dodds, now at the University of Vermont's Vermont Complex Systems Center.

References

External links
 Duncan Watts page at Microsoft

1971 births
Living people
Australian physicists
Australian sociologists
Columbia University faculty
Complex systems scientists
Cornell University alumni
University of New South Wales alumni
Network scientists